Seven Gables is a  mountain summit located in the Sierra Nevada mountain range in Fresno County of northern California, United States. It is situated between the east and south forks of Bear Creek in the John Muir Wilderness, on land managed by Sierra National Forest. Seven Gables ranks as the 133rd highest summit in California.

History

The first ascent of the summit was made September 20, 1894, by Theodore Solomons and Leigh Bierce. Solomons also named it: "The south wall of the gap we found to be the side of a peak, the eccentric shape of which is suggested in the name Seven Gables, which we hastened to fasten upon it". Impressed by the superlative view from the summit, Solomons wrote: "I was too awed to shout. The ideas represented by such words as lovely, beautiful, wild or terrible, cold or desolate, fail to compass it. Words are puny things, and the language of description quite as impotent as the painter's brush. Roughly speaking, one might say that the sight was sublime and awful."

Joseph Nisbet LeConte and Clarence L. Cory climbed it on June 29, 1898, placing a Sierra Club register at the summit. The   Direct East Face, considered one of the classic climbing routes in the Sierra Nevada, was first climbed in 1981 by Claude Fiddler and Vern Clevenger. Galen Rowell put up a new route in 1988. This mountain's name has been officially adopted by the U.S. Board on Geographic Names. Today this peak draws interest because it is on the Sierra Peaks Section's Mountaineers Peaks peak bagging list.

Climate
According to the Köppen climate classification system, Seven Gables is located in an alpine climate zone. Most weather fronts originate in the Pacific Ocean, and travel east toward the Sierra Nevada mountains. As fronts approach, they are forced upward by the peaks, causing them to drop their moisture in the form of rain or snowfall onto the range (orographic lift). Precipitation runoff from this mountain drains into Bear Creek, a tributary of the South Fork San Joaquin River.

Gallery

See also

List of mountain peaks of California

References

External links
 Weather forecast: Seven Gables
 Seven Gables rock climbing: Mountainproject.com

Sierra National Forest
Mountains of Fresno County, California
Mountains of the John Muir Wilderness
North American 3000 m summits
Mountains of Northern California
Sierra Nevada (United States)